Albert Malam (20 January 1913 – February 1992)  was a former professional footballer, who played for Everton, Colwyn Bay, Chesterfield, Huddersfield Town, Wrexham and Doncaster Rovers. During the Second World War he played for Manchester City, Crewe and New Brighton. Became player-manager of Runcorn in the Cheshire League after leaving Wrexham. He was the father of Colin Malam, former football correspondent of The Sunday Telegraph and author.

Honours
Doncaster Rovers
Third Division North
Runner up 1937–38

References

Further reading

1913 births
1992 deaths
English footballers
Footballers from Liverpool
Association football midfielders
English Football League players
Chesterfield F.C. players
Colwyn Bay F.C. players
Huddersfield Town A.F.C. players
Doncaster Rovers F.C. players
Manchester City F.C. wartime guest players
Wrexham A.F.C. players